The Kostyonki–Borshchyovo archaeological complex is an area where numerous Upper Paleolithic archaeological sites have been found, located around the villages of Kostyonki (also Kostenki) and Borshchyovo (also Borshchevo). The area is found on the western (right) bank of the Don River in  Khokholsky District, Voronezh Oblast, Russia, some 25 km south of the city of Voronezh.
The 26 Paleolithic sites of the area are numbered Kostenki 1–21 and Borshchevo 1–5.

It is known for its high concentration of cultural remains of anatomically modern humans from the beginning of the Upper Paleolithic era, before 40,000 years ago.
Finds are on exhibit in situ, at the State Archaeological Museum–Reserve Kostyonki built atop the mammoth bone circle Kostenki11.

History

Mammoth teeth were found at the site from an early time.  Cornelis de Bruijn wrote in 1703:
"In the locality in which we were, to our great surprise, we found many elephant teeth, of which I kept one myself, for the sake of curiosity, but I can not understand how these teeth could get here. True, the Emperor [Peter I] told us that Alexander the Great, passing this river, as some historians assure, reached the small town of Kostenka, about eight versts from here, and that it could very well be that at that time several elephants had fallen, the remains of which are still here today."
The site is also mentioned by Samuel Gottlieb Gmelin in 1768.
The settlement name Kostyonki itself is a derivation from  "bone".

Kostenki-1 was excavated by I. S. Polyakov (1845–1887) in 1879. Further excavations during 1881–1915 were mostly searches for stone tools. Systematic excavations were performed from the 1920s, most notably those led by P.P. Efimenko during 1923–1938.

In the second half of the 20th century it was recognized that there were other sites in the neighbourhood, now labelled 
Kostenki-1 to Kostenki-21 and Borshchevo-1 to Borshchevo-5. The most famous of these are Kostenki-12 (Volkovska) and Kostenki-14 (Markina Gora).

Sites

This initial cultural development might be attributable to local Neanderthals.
Ornaments predating the volcanic eruption, found at Kostenki 17/2 ("Spitsyn culture", 38–32 ka), were apparently perforated by a hand-operated rotary drill or drills; these may suggest that the population was technologically capable of preparing for a volcanic winter. Just above the ash layer sewing needles were found .

Kostenki 1/1, Kostenki 4/2, Kostyonki 8/2 and Kostenki 21/3 belong to the eastern Gravettian (24 to 22 ka).
Kostenki 2, Kostenki 3, Kostenki 11-1a and Kostenki-19 belong to the Zamyatino culture (22 to 17 ka).
Kostenki 8/2 (Telmanskaya) is eponymous of "Telman culture".

As of 2016, archaeological work is done at Kostenki-14 (Markina Gora), Kostenki-6 (Streletskaya), Kostenki-15 (Gorodtsovskaya), Kostenki-16 (Ugljanka), Kostenki-17 (Spitsynskaya) and Kostenki-21 (Gmelinskaya).

Human remains
The earliest directly dated human remains from this site are dated to 32,600 ± 1,100 14C years and consist of a tibia and a fibula, with traits classifying the bones as European early modern humans.

In 2009, DNA was extracted from the remains of a male hunter-gatherer from Kostenki-12 who lived circa 30,000 BP and died aged 20–25. His maternal lineage was found to be mtDNA haplogroup U2. He was buried in an oval pit in a crouched position and covered with red ochre. Kostenki 12 was later found to belong to the patrilineal Y-DNA haplogroup C1* (C-F3393).

A male from Kostenki-14 (Markina Gora),  who lived approximately 35–40,000 BP, was also found to belong to mtDNA haplogroup U2.  His Y-DNA haplogroup was C1b* (C-F1370).
The Kostenki-14 genome represents early evidence for the separation of Europeans and East Asian lineages. It was found to have a close relationship to both "Mal'ta boy" (24 ka) of south-east Siberia (Ancient North Eurasian) and to the later Mesolithic hunter-gatherers of Europe and western Siberia, as well as with a basal population ancestral to Early European Farmers, but not to East Asians.

Volcanic ash
A layer of Campanian volcanic ash from about 45,000 years ago has been found above some of the finds, showing that humans inhabited the site before this.

The Campanian Ignimbrite eruption of the Phlegraean Fields volcano occurred about 39 kya. The explosion of  ignimbrite was the largest in the last 200,000 years of European history.

References

Prehistoric sites in Russia
Paleoanthropological sites
Stone Age sites in Europe
Aurignacian
Gravettian
Peopling of Europe
Upper Paleolithic sites in Europe
Cultural heritage monuments in Voronezh Oblast
Objects of cultural heritage of Russia of federal significance